Hicham Haddad (Arabic: هشام حداد; born 12 August 1978) is a Lebanese comedian, actor and TV show host, currently presenting the show Ktir Hal2ad.

Biography 
He was born in Beirut on August 12, 1978, and is originally from the southern town of Marjayoun.

He studied the Business Administration at Saint Joseph University, and since 1999  he owned a medical machines sales company.

In 2008, his friend director Shadi Hanna, offered him a role in presenting the program "Ovrira" on OTV. Later he began presenting the satirical comedy program "LOL" with his colleague Arze Chidiac, which achieved a great success in Lebanon and Syria. Then he presented a talk show with his brother Maher entitled "Hartakji" in 2012, which lasted until 2015 when he left OTV, and received an offer from the LBCI to submit a program entitled Lahonwbas, a comedy entertainment program.

He then have had several experiences in theatre and cinema in Lebanon, Jordan, Syria, Canada, Dubai, Kuwait.

Personal life 
He married Natalie Zarqa in 2012, and they have 2 sons.

Politics 
He was a follower of the Free Patriotic Movement since 1996, but later left the party.

Controversy 
In April 2016, he mocked in his program "Lahonwbas" the Emirati singer Ahlam, while presenting a cow in his studio.

In January 2018, the Lebanese authorities filed a lawsuit against him based on a memorandum of Justice Minister Salim Jreissati, accusing him of insulting Saudi Crown Prince Muhammad bin Salman following an episode of the same program.

Work 

 2008: Ovrira (TV Show)
2009-2011: Theatrical Plays with Arze Chidiac
 2009-2011: LOL (TV Show)
2011: Cash Flow 1 (Film)
 2012-2014: Hartakji (TV Show) 
2014: Samir and Michel (Play)
 2015–2022: Lahonwbas (TV Show)
2016: Cash Flow 2 (Film)
2016: In the Blink of an Eye (Film) 
2017: Laugh story (Play)
 2018: Tahsil Hasil (TV Show)
2018: Caramel Bean (Film) 
2018: Khamse W Khamsieh (TV Series)
2019: Lahon W Habs (Film) 
 2020: Rahit Alayna (TV Show)
 2020: Hisham Beik (TV Show)
 2020: Yom Eh Yom La2 (Film)
 2023: Ktir Hal2ad (TV Show)

Awards 

 United Arab Emirates: 2017, Best Arab TV Presenter by "Zahrat Al Khaleej" Magazine.
 Lebanon: 2018, Biaf Festival, for the "Lahounwbas" program.

References

1978 births
Living people
Greek Orthodox Christians from Lebanon
Lebanese comedians
Lebanese television personalities
Lebanese television presenters
Lebanese television people
People from Marjeyoun District
Lebanese television talk show hosts